Yemash-Pavlovo is a rural locality (a village) in Chernushinsky District, Perm Krai, Russia. The population was 307 as of 2010. There are 3 streets.

Geography 
Yemash-Pavlovo is located 24 km south of Chernushka (the district's administrative centre) by road. Trushniki is the nearest rural locality.

References 

Rural localities in Chernushinsky District